Tesaglitazar (also known as AZ 242) is a dual peroxisome proliferator-activated receptor agonist with affinity to PPARα and PPARγ, proposed for the management of type 2 diabetes.

The drug had completed several phase III clinical trials, however in May, 2006  AstraZeneca announced that it had discontinued further development.

Cardiac toxicity of tesaglitazar is related to mitochondrial toxicity caused by decrease in PPARγ coactivator 1-α (PPARGC1A, PGC1α) and sirtuin 1 (SIRT1).

References 

Abandoned drugs
Carboxylic acids
Phenol ethers
PPAR agonists
Benzosulfones